Daphnella recifensis is a species of sea snail, a marine gastropod mollusk in the family Raphitomidae.

Description
The length of the shell attains 4.5 mm, its diameter 1.75 mm.

Distribution
This marine species occurs off Cape Recife, South Africa.

References

  Barnard K.H. (1958), Contribution to the knowledge of South African marine Mollusca. Part 1. Gastropoda; Prosobranchiata: Toxoglossa; Annals of the South African Museum. Annale van die Suid-Afrikaanse Museum.; vol. 44 (1958)

External links
 

Endemic fauna of South Africa
recifensis
Gastropods described in 1958